Daniel Lee Dickel (born August 24, 1952) is a former American football linebacker in the National Football League (NFL).  He played linebacker/defensive end for the University of Iowa before being selected by the Baltimore Colts in the 1974 NFL Draft.

Early life
Dickel attended Mid-Prairie High School in Wellman, Iowa.  After high school Dickel attended the University of Iowa.  He was named the Hawkeyes team MVP in 1972 as well as leading the Hawkeyes in tackles for loss in 1972 and 1973. Dickel also was honored as being a co-captain in 1973 for Iowa.

Professional career
Dickel spent five seasons in the NFL, four with the Baltimore Colts from 1974 to 1977, in which he played all 56 of the team's games, and one with the Detroit Lions in 1978. After playing every game from 1974-1977 with the Colts, Dickel played in only four games in 1978 for the Lions.

Coaching career
Dickel was the head football coach at Highland High School in Riverside, Iowa, Iowa City West High School in Iowa City, Iowa, and Kewanee High School in Kewanee, Illinois.  He also served as an assistant coach at both Regina High School and Iowa City High School in Iowa City and West Liberty High School football team in West Liberty, Iowa.

External links
 

1952 births
Living people
People from Fort Riley, Kansas
People from Washington County, Iowa
Players of American football from Iowa
American football linebackers
Iowa Hawkeyes football players
Baltimore Colts players
Detroit Lions players
Coaches of American football from Iowa
High school football coaches in Illinois
High school football coaches in Iowa